The Bibionoidea are a superfamily within the order Diptera. The following families are included within the Bibionoidea:

Bibionidae – March flies
Hesperinidae

References

Diptera superfamilies
Bibionomorpha